Maulana Fazal Ali Haqqani is a Pakistani politician from Zarobi, Swabi District, belong to the Jamiat Ulema-e-Islam (F). who served as Minister of Education and member of the NWFP Assembly (then) now Khyber Pakhtunkhwa Assembly from 2002 to 2007.

References

Living people
Pashtun people
Jamiat Ulema-e-Islam (F) politicians
North-West Frontier Province MPAs 2002–2007
People from Swabi District
Khyber Pakhtunkhwa MPAs 2013–2018
Year of birth missing (living people)